Maria Veronica Widyadharma (born 9 November 1977), known as Veronica Widyadharma, is an Indonesian former professional tennis player.

Tennis career
While competing on the professional tour in the early 1990s, Widyadharma reached career high rankings of 636 for singles and 429 for doubles. She featured in her only WTA Tour singles main draw as a wildcard at the 1995 Wismilak Open, held in Surabaya, Indonesia.

Widyadharma didn't play Fed Cup tennis for Indonesia, but did represent her country at both the Asian Games and Southeast Asian Games (SEA Games). Her individual medals at the SEA Games include a bronze for singles in 1993 and she was also a multiple gold medalist in the team event. At the 1994 Asian Games she was a silver medalist in the team event, as an unused player.

In the late 1990s she began playing varsity tennis for the UCF Knights and was a two-time TAAC Player of the Year.

ITF finals

Doubles: 2 (1–1)

References

External links
 
 

1977 births
Living people
Indonesian female tennis players
UCF Knights athletes
College women's tennis players in the United States
Asian Games silver medalists for Indonesia
Asian Games medalists in tennis
Medalists at the 1994 Asian Games
Tennis players at the 1994 Asian Games
Southeast Asian Games gold medalists for Indonesia
Southeast Asian Games bronze medalists for Indonesia
Southeast Asian Games medalists in tennis
Competitors at the 1993 Southeast Asian Games
Competitors at the 1995 Southeast Asian Games
20th-century Indonesian women